Cataracts Provincial Park is located in Colinet, Newfoundland and Labrador, Canada, on the Avalon Peninsula southeast of Placentia. The park consists of a deep river gorge with two cascading waterfalls. There are stairs and walkways that allow visitors to descend the gorge and cross the river. Thirty five known mosses and liverworts in Newfoundland have been identified in this park. There are picnic sites and outhouse facilities available for visitor use.

Cataracts is intended for day use only; overnight camping is not permitted.

References

External links 
 http://www.newfoundlandlabrador.com/PlanYourTrip/Detail/10539007

Provincial parks of Newfoundland and Labrador